The second season of the American serial drama television series Friday Night Lights commenced airing in the United States and Canada on October 5, 2007 and concluded its 15-episode season on February 7, 2008, on NBC. While initially renewed for a 22-episode full season, the show ended production for the season after filming the 15th episode, due to the 2007–08 Writers Guild of America strike. The series' future was once again placed in doubt as it did not return to production once the strike ended, and it continued to suffer from low ratings in its new Friday at 9:00 pm time slot. However, NBC announced in April 2008 that the show would return for a third season, with first-run broadcasts airing on DirecTV's The 101 Network. The second season was released on DVD in region 1 on April 22, 2008.

Season 2 continues to focus on the Dillon Panthers, as the pressures and challenges on and off the field have reached new highs after the team won the 2006 Texas 5A State Championship and lost head coach Eric Taylor to a coaching job at Texas Methodist University.

Crew
The season was produced by NBC Universal Television, Imagine Television, and Film 44, and was aired on NBC in the United States. Peter Berg, Sarah Aubrey, David Nevins, Brian Grazer, and Jason Katims continued to serve as executive producers, with Jeffrey Reiner, and John Cameron serving as co-executive producers. Writers included Katims, producers David Hudgins and Bridget Carpenter, consulting producers Kerry Ehrin, Patrick Massett, and John Zinman, supervising producers Carter Harris and Elizabeth Heldens, and Aaron Rahsaan Thomas. Katims also served as showrunner. Regular directors throughout the season include Reiner, Jonas Pate, and David Boyd. Theme song music was composed by W. G. Snuffy Walden. Songs from Explosions in the Sky were also used throughout the season.

Cast

The second season saw all 10 star billing roles of season 1 return. Kyle Chandler portrayed Eric Taylor, head coach of the Dillon Panthers. Connie Britton played Tami Taylor, wife of Eric's and guidance counselor of Dillon High School. Gaius Charles played Brian "Smash" Williams, the cocky running back and star of the team. Zach Gilford played quarterback Matt Saracen. Minka Kelly played Lyla Garrity, former girlfriend of Panthers assistant coach Jason Street played by Scott Porter. Taylor Kitsch portrayed Tim Riggins, fullback, resident bad boy, and best friend of Street's. Adrianne Palicki played bad girl Tyra Collette. Jesse Plemons played Landry Clarke, Saracen's best friend. Aimee Teegarden played Julie Taylor, daughter of Eric and Tami's.

Supporting characters who also returned include: Brad Leland as Lyla's father and head of the Dillon Panther's Booster Club Buddy Garrity, Derek Phillips as Tim's brother Billy Riggins, Louanne Stephens as Saracen's grandmother Lorraine Saracen, Liz Mikel as Smash's mother Corrina Williams, Kevin Rankin as Herc, Blue Deckert as Panther coach Mac MacGill, and Dana Wheeler-Nicholson as Tyra's mother Angela Collette.

New guest stars this season included: Glenn Morshower as Landry's father and Dillon police officer Chad Clarke, Daniella Alonso as Lorraine Saracen's new live-in nurse Carlotta, Jessalyn Gilsig as Tami's sister Shelley Hayes, Benny Ciaramello as Santiago Herrera, Chris Mulkey as Coach Bill McGregor, and Matt Czuchry as Lyla's boyfriend Chris Kennedy.

Season synopsis
At the beginning of Season 2, Coach Taylor is living in Austin and coaching at Texas Methodist University as the new football season draws closer. With Taylor gone, coach McGregor is butting heads with players and boosters, Smash's increased cockiness is angering his teammates, and the pressure to get back to the State Championship is increasing, and the Panthers slowly begin falling apart. Things are not well at the Taylor home, either, following the birth of Eric and Tami's daughter Gracie. Tami becomes depressed as she takes care of Gracie alone. Julie refuses to help her mother, begins spending time with male co-worker "The Swede", and breaks up with Matt. Matt, upset over both the breakup and Coach Taylor's absence, faces even more challenges as a rift between himself and Smash emerges, and caring for his grandmother becomes a bigger struggle as her dementia slowly worsens.

Tensions reach a boiling point during the first game of the season. With Taylor watching, Coach McGregor angers the boosters by switching the final play, resulting in Smash and Matt's getting into a physical confrontation. Tami loses it with Julie and slaps her across the face during a late night argument. Street quits his position as assistant coach, fed up with the team and with learning that his condition will not improve, even after he regains full motor control in one of his hands. After losing the second game and seeing another physical confrontation between Smash and Matt, the boosters fire McGregor and offer Taylor the position if he'll leave TMU. Taylor, seeing how bad things are at home with his family and former team, leaves TMU and returns to coach the Panthers.

Fictional game results

 Score was not revealed during episode.
 Score at the end of the third quarter. Final score wasn't revealed.
 Score 28–13 (Fort Hood) at the end of the second quarter. Final score wasn't revealed.
 Panthers' awarded the victory after opposing coach interfered with game play.
 Shown in a deleted scene where the Panthers are playing Royal Rock. Wasn't shown in actual episode.
 Shown in a scene during the beginning of Season 3 Episode 1.

Episodes

Reception
On Rotten Tomatoes, the season has an approval rating of 92% with an average score of 8.1 out of 10 based on 24 reviews. The website's critical consensus reads, "Despite an ill-advised story that threatens to puncture its aura of realism, Season Two of Friday Night Lights continues to deepen the show's winning portrayal of small-town America."

References

External links
 Friday Night Lights – list of episodes at NBC
 

 
2007 American television seasons
2008 American television seasons